Caryocolum leucofasciatum is a moth of the family Gelechiidae. It is found in Spain.

References

Moths described in 1989
leucofasciatum
Moths of Europe